Foz Cataratas Futebol Clube, commonly known as Foz Cataratas, is a Brazilian women's football (soccer) club, based in the city of Foz do Iguaçu, Paraná state, Brazil. They won the 2011 Copa do Brasil, which was the most important competition of Brazilian women's football at the time, and reached the final of the 2012 Copa Libertadores.

History
The club was founded in March 2010 by the businessman and former football announcer Luciano do Valle, and physical education teacher Aleksandro Foagnoli. Their first game ever was played on March 6 of that year, against Paraguayan team Universidad Autnóma, in Foz do Iguaçu. Foz Cataratas won the Campeonato Paranaense in 2010 and in 2011 and finished in the second position in the 2011 Torneio Internacional Interclubes de Futebol Feminino, when they were defeated by Santos in the final. They won the Copa do Brasil in 2011, after they beat Vitória-PE in the final Foz Cataratas competed in the 2012 Copa Libertadores.

Achievements
 Copa do Brasil
 Winners (1): 2011
 Campeonato Paranaense:
 Winners (2): 2010, 2011

Stadium
Foz Cataratas Futebol Clube play their home games at Estádio Pedro Basso.

References

Association football clubs established in 2010
Women's football clubs in Brazil
Football clubs in Paraná (state)
2010 establishments in Brazil